The tenth season of the animated television series, Archer, known as Archer: 1999, premiered on May 29, 2019, on FXX. It is also the final season for Adam Reed as a full-time show runner.

Production
FXX announced that this season would see a change in the time again, with this series taking place in space. Along with the change in the time, the network announced that the same voice cast would return as in previous seasons, and they would again play different versions of their characters. This means that Archer, who was found shot in actress Veronica Deane's pool after season seven, remains in a coma, and the events of the season are of his imagination.

These different versions have similar personalities to their "normal" counterparts but are in different jobs or roles and have different relationships. The season's premise sees Archer as the hard-drinking half-captain (with Lana Kane as the other half-captain) of the spacefaring M/V Seamus salvage ship.

This is the first season where creator Adam Reed has not written every episode for the season.

Synopsis
Sterling Archer in his comatose dreaming imagines that he is the captain of the "M/V Seamus (934TXS)", a space salvage freighter, co-captaining with his ex-wife Lana, with whom he is co-owner of the ship. Krieger is the android scientist/doctor on board, while Cyril is the onboard accountant as well as Lana's lover, and Ray is a gay courtesan. Pam is a hulking grey alien, while Cheryl/Carole is a bloodthirsty/suicidal spacefighter pilot. "Mother", or Ms. Archer, is a glowing ball of light. The crew has the aesthetic of Ridley Scott's Alien's space trucker crew.

The crew have sci-fi space adventures with the usual hijinks. Amongst the recurring characters are Barry-6, a robot space-pirate, and human space-captain Brett. Late in the season, reality begins to intrude upon the scifi premise (which exists only in Archer’s imagination). Archer gets flashes of the characters in their true forms, and believes he is going insane. At the end of the season, Sterling wakes from his coma in the hospital, three years after being shot.

Episodes

References

External links
 
 

2019 American television seasons
American adult animated adventure television series
American adult animated science fiction television series
Animated space adventure television series
Archer (2009 TV series) seasons
Television series set in 1999
Fiction about outer space
Space Western television series
Television series about extraterrestrial life
Television series set on fictional planets
Metafictional television series